Peter Nguyễn Văn Khảm (October 2, 1952) is a Vietnamese prelate of the Catholic Church. He serves as fourth bishop of the Roman Catholic Diocese of Mỹ Tho since July 30, 2014 and the Secretary General of the Catholic Bishops' Conference of Vietnam since 2016. Besides Vietnamese, he is also able to communicate in English, French, and Latin.

Early life and education
Peter Nguyễn Văn Khảm was born on October 2, 1952 in Hà Đông, Viet Nam. He studied at seminaries in Can Tho, Long Xuyen, and Ho Chi Minh City from 1963 to 1979 before he was ordained to priesthood.

Ordination and ministry
Peter Khảm was ordained to the priesthood on August 30, 1980 for the Archdiocese of Ho Chi Minh City, and then served as parochial vicar at Ha Dong church (1980-1983). After three years of his first assignment, he  was transferred to assume the position of parochial administrator of Ha Noi church. He served the parish until 1987, when he was transferred to Notre-Dame Cathedral Basilica of Saigon as parochial vicar and held this position until 1999. Since 1997, he has concurrently been a professor at Saint Joseph Seminary of Saigon until 1999.

From 2000 to 2004, he furthered his studies at The Catholic University of America, and earned a doctorate in pastoral theology. After returning to Vietnam, he served as the Director of the Ho Chi Minh City Archdiocesan Pastoral Center.

Episcopal ministry

Auxiliary bishop of Ho Chi Minh City (2008-2014)
On October 15, 2008, Pope Benedict XVI appointed him the Auxiliary Bishop of Archdiocese of Ho Chi Minh City. On November 15, 2008, he was consecrated as bishop by Cardinal Jean-Baptiste Phạm Minh Mẫn of Ho Chi Minh City. The co-consecrators were 
coadjutor bishop Stephen Tri Bửu Thiên of Cần Thơ and auxiliary bishop Joseph Vũ Duy Thống of Ho Chi Minh City. He served as rector of Saint Joseph Seminary of Saigon from 2011-2013.

Bishop of Mỹ Tho (2014-present)

On July 26, 2014, he was appointed as Bishop of Roman Catholic Diocese of Mỹ Tho by Pope Francis, and was installed on August 30, 2014.

Within the Catholic Bishops' Conference of Vietnam, he has served as General Secretary since 2016. His previous posts were Deputy General Secretary (2010-2016) and Chair of Committee on Social Communications (2010-2013).

On July 13, 2016, Pope Francis appointed bishop Peter Nguyễn Văn Khảm as a member of the Dicastery for Communication.

References

External links
http://www.catholic-hierarchy.org/bishop/bngvk.html
http://cbcvietnam.org/Dioceses/my-tho-diocese.html

Notes

1952 births
Living people
21st-century Roman Catholic bishops in Vietnam
People from Hanoi